The 2019 Maltese Super Cup was the 35th Maltese Super Cup, an annual football match played between the title holders of the Maltese Premier League and the Maltese FA Trophy. It was contested on 21 December 2019 by Valletta – who won league, after defeating Hibernians in the decider and Balzan who won FA Trophy the previous season. Played at the Ta' Qali National Stadium, Valletta won the match 2–1.

Match

Details

References 

1
2019–20 in European football
2019 in association football
Maltese Super Cup